Hooveria may refer to:

 Hooveria, a genus of perennial bulbous plants native to North America.
 932 Hooveria, a minor planet.

See also 
 Hoover (surname)

Taxonomy disambiguation pages
Science disambiguation pages